Ulugh Muztagh or Ulugh Muztag (Uighur: Ulug muz tag)  and Muztag Feng, is an extremely remote mountain group on the northern Qinghai-Tibetan Plateau. Located on the border between the Tibetan Autonomous Region and Xinjiang Uyghur Autonomous Region, it is part of the main range of the Kunlun Mountains of East-Central Asia.

There have been only a few attempts to climb Ulugh Muztagh and several of them have not been even able to reach the foot of the mountain. Getting near the mountain requires a difficult drive across terrain at the elevation of 4300–5000 metres. Expeditions who have climbed the mountain spent 2 to 3 weeks on the approach alone using 4 or 6 wheel drive vehicles.

The 7,723 metre elevation claim was made by the English country gentleman and explorer St George Littledale in 1895. Despite the fact that earlier explorers had put forward elevations several hundred metres lower, and the scientific 6,973 metre measurement made in 1985, the Littledale elevation has been so resilient that even into the 21st century it still remains the most widely quoted; it is found in generally reliable publications,  including the Times Atlas and fact books.

Other remote Tibetan-related mountains whose elevations have been established by SRTM and modern Chinese mapping include:
 Nganglong (Aling) Kangri, 6,720 m, but still often quoted at 7,315 m 
 Amne Machin (Maqen Gangri), 6,282 m, but still often quoted at 7,160 m
 Bukadaban Feng, 6,860 m, but still quoted much higher
 Zangser Kangri, 6,540 m, but still sometimes quoted at 6,940 m.

Northeast of Ulugh Muztagh an endorheic basin with several important lakes (Aqqikol, Ayakkum, Jingyu, etc.) is located. The basin is bounded by the main range of the Kunlun in the south, and by the more or less parallel range, the Altyn-Tagh, in the north. Much of the basin is officially protected as the Altun Shan Nature Reserve.

See also
 List of Ultras of Tibet, East Asia and neighbouring areas

References
Notes

Sources
 William Holgate, Arka Tagh: the Mysterious Mountains, The Ernest Press 1994, . The elevation of Ulugh Muztagh is discussed on p. 122.

External links 
 Ulugh Muztagh on summitpost

Mountain ranges of Tibet
Mountain ranges of Xinjiang
Six-thousanders of the Kunlun